Cuers is a commune in the Var department in the Provence-Alpes-Côte d'Azur region in southeastern France.

It was one of the locations of the 1995 Éric Borel spree killings.

Geography

Climate

Cuers has a hot-summer Mediterranean climate (Köppen climate classification Csa).

Population

See also
Communes of the Var department

References

External links

Official site

Communes of Var (department)